Chelleh Khaneh-ye Sofla (also Romanized as Chelleh Khāneh-ye Soflá and Chellah Khāneh-Ye Soflá; also known as Ashāqī Chelleh Khāneh, Chellah Khāneh Pā’īn, Chelleh Khāneh Pā’īn, Chelleh Khāneh-ye Ashāqī, Chelleh Khāneh-ye Pā’īn, Chilakhana-Ashaga, and Chilakhāna Ashāghi) is a village in Chelleh Khaneh Rural District, Sufian District, Shabestar County, East Azerbaijan Province, Iran. At the 2006 census, its population was 367, in 74 families.

References 

Populated places in Shabestar County